The following are the national records in athletics in Curaçao maintained by its national athletics federation: Curaçaose Atletiek Bond (CAB).

Outdoor

Men

Women

Indoor

Men

Women

References

External links

Curacao
Records
Records in athletics